Ribonuclease inhibitor is an enzyme that in humans is encoded by the RNH1 gene.

References

Further reading